Bobby Jackson (born 1973), is an American former basketball player.

Bobby Jackson may also refer to:

Bobby Jackson (cornerback) (born 1956), American football cornerback
Bobby Jackson (American football coach) (born 1940), American football coach
Bobby Jackson (defensive back) (1936–2009), American football defensive back

See also
Bob Jackson (disambiguation)
Robert Jackson (disambiguation)